Walwa(Waḷwa) is a town and a taluka in Sangli district in the Indian state of Maharashtra. It is also known as Walwa-Islampur Taluka. There are ninety-five panchayat villages in Walwa Taluka.

It is 200 km from Pune and 340 km from Mumbai.  Before independence, Walawa was known for its Prati Sarkar movement, particularly for Krantishigh Nana Patil and Nagnath Naikwadi.

The Krishna River passes through the taluka. The major crops produced in the taluka are sugarcane and grapes. The major occupations are Agriculture and Animal Husbandry.

Demographics
In the 2001 India census, Walwa Taluka had 427,377 inhabitants, 220,542 (51.6%) were males and 206,835 (48.4%) were females, for a gender ratio of 938 females per thousand males. The taluka was 78.6% rural in 2001.

In the 2011 census the population had increased to 455,138 inhabitants and a gender ratio of 939 females per thousand males. The taluka was 77.0% rural in 2011. The literacy rate in 2011 was 86.03% overall in Walwa Taluka, with a rate of 92.83% for males and 78.92% for females. In 2011 in Walwa Taluka, 9.66% of the population was 0 to 6 years of age.

List of towns and villages
There are two towns in Walwa Taluka, Ashta and Uran Islampur both with municipal councils. There are more than ninety-five villages.

See also
 Bapu Biru Vategaonkar
 Jayant Rajaram Patil

Notes

Cities and towns in Sangli district